SR22 or SR-22 may refer to:
 SR-22 (insurance), an official liability insurance document required in some US states
 Cirrus SR22, a type of general aviation light aircraft
 State Route 22, which may be any one of many highways numbered 22
 Ruger SR22, a 22 caliber pistol
 Ruger SR-22, a 22 caliber rifle